William Alves may refer to:

William Alves Boys (1868–1938), Canadian politician and barrister
William Alves (footballer, born 1986), Brazilian football centre-back
William Alves (footballer, born 1987), Brazilian football centre-back
William Alves (footballer, born 1991), Brazilian football forward